Circus Circus is used as the name for:

Casinos
 Circus Circus Atlantic City, a defunct hotel and casino project, Atlantic City, New Jersey
 Circus Circus Enterprises, later Mandalay Resort Group, a casino operator
 Circus Circus Las Vegas, owned by Phil Ruffin
 Circus Circus Reno, owned and operated by Caesars Entertainment
 Circus Circus Tunica, now Gold Strike Casino Resort, Tunica, Mississippi

Music
 Circus Circus (1900s band), a band that lasted from 1979 to 1981 and featured Blackie Lawless
 Circus Circus (2000s band), a Post Hardcore band